Parliamentary elections were held in the Seychelles on 7 August 1983 for the People's Assembly. The Seychelles People's Progressive Front was the sole legal party at the time, and all candidates were members. Thirty candidates stood for 23 seats, 17 of them unopposed. A further two members were appointed by President France-Albert René.

Results

References

1983 in Seychelles
Elections in Seychelles
One-party elections
Seychelles
Election and referendum articles with incomplete results